Mario Klingemann (born 1970 in Laatzen, Lower Saxony) is a German artist best known for his work involving neural networks, code, and algorithms. Klingemann was a Google Arts and Culture resident from 2016 to 2018, and he is considered as a pioneer in the use of computer learning in the arts. His works examine creativity, culture, and perception through machine learning and artificial intelligence, and have appeared at the Ars Electronica Festival, the Museum of Modern Art New York, the Metropolitan Museum of Art New York, the Photographers’ Gallery London, the Centre Pompidou Paris, and the British Library. Today he lives in Munich, where, in addition to his art under the name "Dog & Pony", he still runs a creative free space between gallery and Wunderkammer with the paper artist Alexandra Lukaschewitz.

References

External links 
  Quasimondo
 Twitter feed
 X Degrees of Separation Google Arts & Culture Experiments
 Interview with Bayerischer Rundfunk (German)
 Presentation at Beyond Tellerrand conference, Dusseldorf, Germany 2017

German conceptual artists
Digital art
Artificial intelligence art
Living people
1970 births